"Baby Don't Cry (Keep Ya Head Up II)" is a posthumous hip hop single by 2Pac and the Outlawz from the album Still I Rise. It features pop band H.E.A.T., E.D.I. Mean of Outlawz, Young Noble and others. It charted at #72 on the Billboard Hot 100.

Music video
The video made for the song was shot during September 1–3, 1999, and is the only song from the album to have a music video. The song shows the Outlawz performing and features footage of Keep Ya Head Up.

Track listing
 LP Version
 Soulshock & Karlin Remix Dirty Version
 Instrumental
 Acappella

Charts

References

1999 singles
Tupac Shakur songs
Interscope Records singles
Songs released posthumously
Songs written by Tupac Shakur
1999 songs